Augusta is a city in Butler County, Kansas, United States.  As of the 2020 census, the population of the city was 9,256.

History

19th century
The confluence of the Whitewater River and the Walnut River was originally inhabited by Osage people, who found the land ideal for hunting and fishing.

In 1868, C. N. James settled in the area and built a log cabin to serve also as a general store and trading post. Around that same time, a post office was established in the settlement, and as the first postmaster, C. N. James named the post office and the town in honor of his wife, Augusta James.

In 1877, the Florence, El Dorado, and Walnut Valley Railroad Company built a branch line from Florence to El Dorado. In 1881 it was extended to Douglass, and later to Arkansas City.  The rail line was leased and operated by the Atchison, Topeka and Santa Fe Railway. Service from Florence to El Dorado was abandoned in 1942.  The original branch line connected Florence, Burns, De Graff, El Dorado, Augusta, Douglass, Rock, Akron, Winfield, Arkansas City.  In 2020, the Santa Fe (now BNSF) still maintains tracks through Augusta at the 301 E. Fifth St. headquarters, a brick depot constructed in 1916–1917.  The St. Louis & San Francisco (Frisco) Railroad established a depot in Augusta in 1880, serving both passengers and freight. Passenger service ended in 1960.

20th century
The discovery of oil near Augusta in 1914, and soon elsewhere in Butler County, led to                                                                    the doubling of the population of Augusta between 1910 and 1920.  Oil drilling and refining became a major source of employment for many years. In 1916, L. L. Marcell founded the White Eagle Oil Company in Augusta. Other early refineries were the Walnut Refining Company and the Lakeside Refinery.   In 1930, White Eagle was purchased by the Standard Oil Company of New York and was known as "Socony-Vacuum" for many years, then renamed Mobil in 1966.  The closure of Mobil Refinery in 1983 marked a change in Augusta's commerce.

21st century
In 2010, the Keystone-Cushing Pipeline (Phase II) was constructed about 1.5 miles west of Augusta, north to south through Butler County, with much controversy over tax exemption and environmental concerns (if a leak ever occurs).

Geography
Augusta is located at  (37.692425, -96.979886), at the confluence of the Walnut and Whitewater Rivers. It is located along the western edge of Butler County.

Climate
The climate in this area is characterized by hot, humid summers and generally mild to cool winters. According to the Köppen Climate Classification system, Augusta has a humid subtropical climate, abbreviated "Cfa" on climate maps.

Demographics

2010 census
As of the census of 2010, there were 9,274 people, 3,669 households, and 2,448 families living in the city. The racial makeup of the city was 94.2% White, 0.4% African American, 1.3% Native American, 0.6% Asian, 0.1% Pacific Islander, 1.1% from other races, and 2.3% from two or more races. Hispanic or Latino of any race were 4% of the population.

There were 3,669 households, of which 35.1% had children under the age of 18 living with them, 50.1% were married couples living together, 12.4% had a female householder with no husband present, 4.2% had a male householder with no wife present, and 33.3% were non-families. 29.3% of all households were made up of individuals, and 14.9% had someone living alone who was 65 years of age or older. The average household size was 2.50 and the average family size was 3.10.

The median age in the city was 35.7 years. 27.9% of residents were under the age of 18; 8.4% were between the ages of 18 and 24; 25% were from 25 to 44; 23.2% were from 45 to 64; and 15.6% were 65 years of age or older. The gender makeup of the city was 47.2% male and 52.8% female.

2000 census
As of the census of 2000, there were 8,423 people, 3,277 households, and 2,307 families living in the city. The racial makeup of the city was 96.07% White, 0.18% African American, 0.83% Native American, 0.36% Asian, 0.68% from other races, and 1.89% from two or more races. Hispanic or Latino of any race were 2.59% of the population.

There were 3,277 households, out of which 35.7% had children under the age of 18 living with them, 56.6% were married couples living together, 10.4% had a female householder with no husband present, and 29.6% were non-families. 26.3% of all households were made up of individuals, and 12.5% had someone living alone who was 65 years of age or older. The average household size was 2.53 and the average family size was 3.06.

In the city, the population was spread out, with 28.0% under the age of 18, 8.9% from 18 to 24, 27.9% from 25 to 44, 19.4% from 45 to 64, and 15.7% who were 65 years of age or older. The median age was 35 years. For every 100 females there were 90.3 males. For every 100 females age 18 and over, there were 86.6 males.

The median income for a household in the city was $41,818, and the median income for a family was $51,886. Males had a median income of $36,465 versus $24,747 for females. The per capita income for the city was $19,094. About 4.1% of families and 5.7% of the population were below the poverty line, including 5.8% of those under age 18 and 7.5% of those age 65 or over.

Education
The community is served by Augusta USD 402 public school district.

Landmarks
The Augusta Historic Theater, now home to the Augusta Arts Council, is a classic example of Art Deco.  Augusta is also home to the Kansas Museum of Military History (formerly Augusta Air Museum).  The Augusta Historical Museum and the C.N. James Log Cabin are on the National Register of Historic Places.   Also Henry's Sculpture Hill is located outside the cities limit.  Augusta does offer an airport called the Augusta Municipal Airport.

Media
Augusta is home to the Butler County Times-Gazette (formerly various local newspaper companies including the Augusta Gazette, Andover American, and El Dorado Times), a tri-weekly newspaper covering Augusta and neighboring towns.

Notable people
 
 Madelyn Dunham, grandmother of Barack Obama.
 Bob Whittaker, U.S. Representative from Kansas; resident of Augusta.

See also
 National Register of Historic Places listings in Butler County, Kansas
 C. N. James Cabin
 Loomis-Parry Residence

References

Further reading

External links

 City of Augusta
 Augusta - Directory of Public Officials
 Augusta Chamber of Commerce
 Augusta City Map, KDOT

 
Cities in Kansas
Cities in Butler County, Kansas
Wichita, KS Metropolitan Statistical Area
Populated places established in 1868
1868 establishments in Kansas